Men's ice hockey tournaments have been staged at the Olympic Games since 1920. The men's tournament was introduced at the 1920 Summer Olympics, and permanently added to the Winter Olympic Games in 1924. Belgium has participated in four tournaments: 1920, 1924, 1928, and 1936. The 1920 Olympics was hosted by Belgium, in the city of Antwerp. A total of 5 goaltenders and 27 skaters have represented Belgium at the Olympics.

Pierre Van Reysschoot has scored the  most goals, 6; assists and penalties were not accurately recorded in the early Olympic tournaments. Roger Bureau, François Franck, Willy Kreitz, and Van Reysschoot all played in the most games, 6. Those four plus Louis De Ridder, Charles Van den Driessche, Gaston van Volxem, and Philippe Van Volckxsom all played in two Olympics, the most for Belgium. Only one player, Paul Loicq has been inducted into the IIHF Hall of Fame, as a builder (executive) in 1997.

Key

Goaltenders

Skaters

Notes

References
 
 
 

Ice hockey
Belgium
Belgium